A transition or linking word is a word or phrase that shows the relationship between paragraphs or sections of a text or speech. Transitions provide greater cohesion by making it more explicit or signaling how ideas relate to one another. Transitions are, in fact, "bridges" that "carry a reader from section to section". Transitions guide a reader/listener through steps of logic, increments of time, or through physical space. Transitions "connect words and ideas so that [...] readers don't have to do the mental work for [themselves]."

Definition

In simple terms, a transition word demonstrates the relationship between two portions of a text or spoken language. By using the imagery of a bridge, a person can see how these words take readers/listeners from one statement to another. By using these words, people can better build a sentence and convey what they are trying to say in a more concise manner.

Coordinating transitions
Elements in a coordinate relationship are equal in rank, quality, or significance. They help to show a link between equal elements.
To show similarity or reinforce: also, and, as well as, by the same token, comparatively, correspondingly, coupled with, equally, equally important, furthermore, identically, in the light of, in the same fashion/way, likewise, moreover, not only ... but also, not to mention, similarly, to say nothing of, together with, too, uniquely
To introduce an opposing point: besides, but, however, in contrast, neither, nevertheless, nor, on the contrary, on the other hand, still, yet
To signal a restatement: in other words, in simpler terms, indeed, that is, to put it differently

Subordinating transitions
To introduce an item in a series: finally, first, for another, for one thing, in addition, in the first place, in the second place, last, next, second, then
To introduce an example: for example, for instance, in particular, namely, specifically, that is
To show causality: accordingly, as a result, because, consequently, for, hence, since, so, then, therefore, thus
To introduce a summary or conclusion: actually, all in all, altogether, clearly, evidently, finally, in conclusion, of course, to sum up
To signal a concession: certainly, granted, it is true, naturally, of course, to be sure
To resume main argument after a concession: all the same, even though, nevertheless, nonetheless, still

Temporal transitions
To show frequency: again and again, day after day, every so often, frequently, hourly, now and then, occasionally, often
To show duration: briefly, during, for a long time, minute by minute, while
To show a particular time: at six o'clock, at that time, first thing in the morning, in 1999, in the beginning of August, in those days, last Sunday, next Christmas, now, then, two months ago, when
To introduce a beginning: at first, before then, in the beginning, since
To introduce a middle: as it was happening, at that moment, at the same time, in the meantime, meanwhile, next, simultaneously, then
To signal an end (or beyond): afterward/afterwards, at last, eventually, finally, in the end, later

Spatial transitions
To show closeness: adjacent to, alongside, close to, facing, near, next to, side by side
To show long distance: away, beyond, far, in the distance, there
To show direction: above, across, along, away from, behind, below, down, in front of, inside, outside, sideways, to the left, to the right, toward/towards, up

Transition words of agreement, addition, or similarity 

The transition words, such as also, in addition, and likewise, add information, reinforce ideas, and express agreement with preceding material.

 additionally
 again
 also
 and
 as
 as a matter of fact
 as well as
 by the same token
 comparatively
 correspondingly
 coupled with
 equally
 equally important
 first
 furthermore
 identically
 in addition
 in like manner
 in the first place
 in the light of
 in the same fashion/way
 like
 likewise
 moreover
 not only ... but also
 not to mention
 of course
 second
 similarly
 then
 third
 to
 to say nothing of
 together with
 too
 uniquely
 what's more

See also
Conjunction
Level of measurement
Concept map

Notes

References

Parts of speech
Plain English
writing